Juncus usitatus, the common rush, is a species of flowering plant in the rush family, Juncaceae. A graceful, clumping plant growing from 40 cm to 1.1 metres high. Commonly found in New Zealand and eastern Australia in disturbed sites by stream banks and other moist habitats. The specific epithet is derived from Latin, meaning "common or usual".

References

usitatus
Plants described in 1963
Flora of New South Wales
Flora of Victoria (Australia)
Flora of Queensland
Flora of Western Australia
Flora of South Australia
Flora of New Zealand
Flora of New Caledonia
Flora of the Kermadec Islands